The Ministry of Civil Service (MOCS) is a second level policy-making body, governed under the Examination Yuan of the Republic of China (Taiwan) and is the fundamental Examination Yuan agency responsible for overseeing pay and entitlements, performance evaluation, insurance, retirement and pension programs, and relief for civil servants throughout Taiwan.

Core functions 

The ministry exercises authority over the employment and discharge, performance evaluation, pay grading, promotion and transfer, insurance, retirement, and compensation for civil servants. The ministry is also responsible for the management of the Public Service Pension Funds as well as the supervision of the Directorate-General of Personnel Administration regarding personnel policy and the oversight of central and local personnel agencies.

Ministry structure
The Ministry is currently organized as follows:
 Department of Personnel Planning and Regulations
 Department of General Quantification Screening
 Department of Special Quantification Screening
 Department of Retirement and Survivor
 Department of Personnel Management
 Special Operations Units
 Public Service Pension Fund Management Board
 Public Servant and Teacher Insurance Supervisory Committee

Ministers

See also 
 Government of the Republic of China
 Examination Yuan
 Ministry of Examination

References

External links 
 

Examination Yuan
National civil service commissions
Civil Service
Ministries established in 1930
1930 establishments in China